is a former Japanese football player. He played for Japan national team.

Club career
Sugamata was born in Utsunomiya on November 29, 1957. After graduating from Hosei University, he joined Hitachi in 1980. The club won the 2nd place in 1980 JSL Cup, 1982 Japan Soccer League. He retired in 1987. He played 131 games in the league. He was selected Best Eleven in 1980 and 1982).

National team career
On July 23, 1978, when Sugamata was a Hosei University student, he debuted for Japan national team against Singapore. After he joined Hitachi, he played for Japan again in June 1980. In December, he was selected Japan for 1982 World Cup qualification. In 1982, he also played at 1982 Asian Games. He played 23 games for Japan until 1984.

National team statistics

References

External links
 
 Japan National Football Team Database

1957 births
Living people
Hosei University alumni
Association football people from Tochigi Prefecture
Japanese footballers
Japan international footballers
Japan Soccer League players
Kashiwa Reysol players
Footballers at the 1982 Asian Games
Association football defenders
Asian Games competitors for Japan